Michael Kelly (March 29, 1872 – May 3, 1923) was an American sport shooter, born in Attymon, County Galway, Ireland, who competed in the 1920 Summer Olympics. In 1920 he won the gold medal as member of the American team in the team 30 metre military pistol competition as well as in the 50 metre free pistol event.

References

External links
Michael Kelly's profile at databaseOlympics

1872 births
1923 deaths
American male sport shooters
United States Distinguished Marksman
ISSF pistol shooters
Shooters at the 1920 Summer Olympics
Olympic gold medalists for the United States in shooting
Olympic medalists in shooting
Medalists at the 1920 Summer Olympics
19th-century American people
20th-century American people